The Borden Milk Co. Creamery and Ice Factory is a historical site in Tempe, Arizona. Built originally as an ice plant, it was altered to also produce pasteurized bottled milk. The Pacific Creamery Plant was sold in 1927, and it operated under the Borden name until its closure in 1953. The building stood empty until it was reopened as Four Peaks Brewery, a restaurant and regional brewery. The Borden operation had enough impact on the city that a new park was designated "Creamery Park" in 1999.

Built in the Mission Revival style, the building is almost entirely red brick, with wooden ceilings and a glass clerestory reaching as high as 35 feet, supported by steel suspension. The nine buildings were listed on the National Register of Historic Places in 1984.

Gallery

See also
 National Register of Historic Places listings in Maricopa County, Arizona
 List of historic properties in Tempe, Arizona

References

Buildings and structures in Tempe, Arizona
Ice trade
National Register of Historic Places in Maricopa County, Arizona
Mission Revival architecture in Arizona
1892 establishments in Arizona Territory
Industrial buildings completed in 1892